Yuval Shawat is a former Israeli footballer.

He is of a Tunisian-Jewish descent.

References

1989 births
Israeli Jews
Living people
Israeli footballers
Hapoel Afula F.C. players
Maccabi Umm al-Fahm F.C. players
Hapoel Acre F.C. players
Hapoel Nof HaGalil F.C. players
Footballers from Afula
Israeli people of Tunisian-Jewish descent
Liga Leumit players
Israeli Premier League players
Association football midfielders